Valvata tricarinata, common name the three-ridge valvata or threeridge valvata, is a species of small freshwater snail with a gill and an operculum, an aquatic gastropod mollusk in the family Valvatidae, the valve snails.

Distribution 
This species occurs in North America.

Shell description 
There is great variation in the degree of carination of the shell.

Paleontology 
Valvata tricarinata is abundant in nearly all lacustrine and fluviatile deposits in North America of the Pleistocene period. The fossil shells are more variable than the Recent ones. Eight forms or subspecies were described.

References 
This article incorporates public domain text from the reference.

 Turgeon, D.D., et al. 1998. Common and scientific names of aquatic invertebrates of the United States and Canada. American Fisheries Society Special Publication 26

External links 
 Photo of the shell of Valvata tricarinata

Valvatidae
Gastropods described in 1817